Kemal Cetinay (born 25 April 1996) is a British presenter, TV personality and entrepreneur. He appeared on ITV2 reality series Love Island in 2017, where he won the series.

Early life
Cetinay was born on 25 April 1996, in Essex, England, to parents Niyazi and Figen Cetinay, who are from Cyprus. He was raised in Essex along with his brother, Izzy Cetinay.

Career
Presenter, TV personality and entrepreneur Cetinay began his career the third series of the ITV2 reality series Love Island. He won the 2017 series and is now the host of the official Love Island podcast The Morning After. During his time in the Love Island villa, Cetinay developed a bromance with fellow Islander Chris Hughes and the pair have starred in multiple formats together, including the ITV2 spin off show Straight Outta Love Island and Channel 4's Celebrity Hunted for Stand Up To Cancer plus two series of ITV2's challenge based entertainment game show You Vs. Chris & Kem.

Cetinay works with ITV's This Morning as their entertainment presenter and after appearing on ITV1's Dancing on Ice in 2018, he became their backstage presenter throughout the 2019 and 2020 series.

In October 2017, he and fellow Love Island contestant, Chris Hughes released a grime single, "Little Bit Leave It", which reached number 15.

Ahead of the fourth series in 2018, it was revealed that Cetinay would be returning alongside Arielle Free to present Love Island: The Morning After, a new daily podcast show delivering the freshest gossip to fans.

In January 2018, Cetinay became a contestant on the 10th series of reality TV show, Dancing on Ice. He and his partner Alex Murphy finished in 4th place. In 2019, he returned to the show as the digital host. He has since gone on to be a guest on several television series, including Love Island: Aftersun, I'm a Celebrity: Extra Camp and Happy Hour with Olly Murs, a one-off special.

In June 2019, Cetinay played in the annual Soccer Aid match which was held at Stamford Bridge. With seven minutes remaining Cetinay scored the Rest of the World's second goal and after the match ended 2-2 he scored his team's third and final penalty in the shoot out, which the Rest of the World won 3-1. He followed this by scoring the winning penalty in 2020; two goals in 2021; and a goal and a penalty in another victorious shoot out in 2022. He is the joint top scorer in Soccer Aid matches with four, along with former Dutch international Clarence Seedorf.

Cetinay is the co-founder of the restaurant Array in Essex, England.

Personal life
During 2017, Cetinay dated fellow Love Island contestant, Amber Davies, splitting in December 2017.

In August 2022, Cetinay was involved in a collision with 28 year old Tommy Griggs, in Hornchurch, East London, where Griggs was pronounced dead at the scene.

Filmography

Guest appearances
 Celebrity Juice (2017)
 I'm a Celebrity: Extra Camp (2017, 2018)
 How to Spend It Well at Christmas with Phillip Schofield (2017)
 Loose Women (2017, 2018)
 Lorraine (2018, 2019, 2021)
 Love Island: Aftersun (2018, 2019)
 Hey Tracey (2019)
 Pants on Fire (2019)
 Home Alone with Joel Dommett (2020)

Discography

Singles

As Chris & Kem

References

Living people
1996 births
English male rappers
English people of Turkish Cypriot descent
English people of Turkish descent
Musicians from Essex
Television personalities from Essex
Love Island (2015 TV series) contestants